Lleyton Hewitt was the defending champion, but he lost to Juan Ignacio Chela in the quarterfinals.Chela won in the final 5–7, 6–4, 6–3 against Sam Querrey.

Seeds
The top four seeds receive a bye into the second round.

Draw

Finals

Top half

Bottom half

Qualifying

Seeds

Qualifiers

Lucky losers

Draw

First qualifier

Second qualifier

Third qualifier

Fourth qualifier

External links
 Main draw
 Qualifying draw

2010 ATP World Tour
Singles